Malossi S.p.A. is an Italian manufacturer of tuning parts for mopeds and scooters. It was founded by Armando Malossi in 1930.

Originally the company specialised in tuning Dell'orto carburettors for motorcycles. This strong association continues to this day with Malossi providing a huge array of carburettors and kits for mopeds, scooters, and motorcycles. Among other products, Malossi manufactures cylinders and variators for both racing and road use. Malossi currently produces two product lines, the Malossi and the MHR (Malossi Hyper Racing), which is exclusively for racing use.

Malossi's main competitor is Polini, also based in Italy.

A Norwegian rock band named itself after the company.

See also

List of Italian companies

References

External links
 Malossi Official Website
 Malossi US Portal

Auto parts suppliers of Italy
Automotive motorsports and performance companies
Manufacturing companies established in 1930
Italian companies established in 1930
Italian brands
Motorcycle parts manufacturers
Two-stroke gasoline engines